Dhan Bahadur Buda is a Nepalese Politician, Minister of culture and serving as the Member Of House Of Representatives (Nepal) elected from Dolpa-1, Province No. 6. He served as State Minister for Culture, Tourism and Civil Aviation	 in Second Oli cabinet He is member of the CPN (Unified Socialist).

References

Living people
Communist Party of Nepal (Unified Socialist) politicians
Nepal Communist Party (NCP) politicians
People from Dolpa District
Place of birth missing (living people)
21st-century Nepalese politicians
Nepal MPs 2017–2022
Members of the 2nd Nepalese Constituent Assembly
Communist Party of Nepal (Unified Marxist–Leninist) politicians
1975 births
Nepal MPs 2022–present